Domenicangela Lina Unali (born 1936 in Rome) has been professor of English literature at the Faculty of Letters, University of Rome Tor Vergata since 1983. Previously, from 1969 to 1982, she taught at the University of Cagliari. She was Secretary and Treasurer of AISNA (Italian Association for North American Studies) in the years 1971-1973.

Career
Born in Rome on 18 November 1936, her parents came from Logudor in North-Eastern Sardinia. Her ancestors, on her mother's side, had the family name of Morla, and in the town of Bortigali according to the parish records they were present since 1680 . A novel by Lina Unali entitled Generale Andaluso is about General Thomas Morla (1751-1811) whom her family considered an ancestor.

Both her father, Gen. Eugenio Unali, and her mother Maria Pinna, daughter of Giuseppina Salaris Morla and of the painter Salvatorico Pinna from the Belle Arti Academy (Accademia di Belle Arti di Roma of Via Ripetta in Rome), founded in 1870,  were born in Pozzomaggiore. Her Sardinian origins have been relevant in her life and studies. She is now listed among the authors of contemporary Sardinian literature. she is the author of an online Logudorese-Italian Glossary, published by Babylon, mainly based on her mother's language as she remembered it after her death.

Unali has combined scientific research with the writing of poetry and narratives. She published her first narrative, La Sardegna del Desiderio (Sardinia of Desire) in (1991). She received the Alghero Donna National Prize for works of narrative in 1995, the Parola di Donna Prize for works of poetry in 2002 and the same prize for fiction in 2003. At Cagliari, in 2013 she received a special mention in the Fernando Pilia Literary Award for criticism. The book The West in Asia and Asia in the West: Essays on Transnational Interactions is dedicated in tribute to the professional and academic achievements of Unali.

Unali was engaged in research on the relationship between Asia and West. She published the book Talk Story in Chinatown and Away (1998) based on the Conference of the Association of American Studies in Warsaw to which she contributed on a panel. Later on, in the year 2000, the essay "'Complexity is not a Crime': Marianne Moore’s Cultural Poetics" by Eulalia Piñero C. Gil, from the Universidad Autónoma de Madrid, quoting Unali, defined her scholarly profile as both that of an Americanist and of a Sinologist.

A student of Agostino Lombardo at Sapienza University of Rome and an assistant for several years in the Institute then directed by Mario Praz, she continued her studies in the United States with a Fulbright scholarship
 (1961–62) at the University of Washington in Seattle, where she attended classes on poetry held by Theodore Roethke and in the second semester, moved to the Department of English of Harvard University. Later, she obtained a Fulbright visiting professorship (1972–73) at Harvard University, under the sponsorship of Joel Porte.

In the years 1961-62, she shared her American experience with the economist Pierangelo Garegnani (then at M.I.T. with a Rockefeller Fellowship), whom she married in 1964.

Under the patronage of Jawaharlal Nehru University, she did research on intercultural relations between England and India in the years from 1981 to 1985. She obtained a Fellowship from the Taiwan Academy of Science that engaged her for one year in research and teaching, directing in particular her attention to the study of the Chinese culture and language. She taught several courses at the National Taiwan University among which History of European Thought and American Poetry. She taught at the Somali National University, in the years 1981, 1988 and 1989.

Lina Unali is the honorary president of the Center Asia and the West  by her founded in 2008 for the study of the relationships between Europe and Asia.

While in Taipei she published an Anthology of Italian poetry entitled Modern Italian Poetry.

In the academic year 2006-2007, she has been Director of the Doctorate in Foreign Languages and Literatures at the Faculty of Letters of her University.

She is also an established poet, her most recent compositions were published in the Paterson Literary Review (Paterson, NJ).
She obtained a certificate of merit at the concorso di poesia "S. Agata dei Goti" 2019 and 2020

Literary criticism
 "Poesie di Langston Hughes", Giornale di Poesia, Roma, 1960
 "Marianne Moore", Studi Americani, no. 9, Roma, 1964
 "Introduzione a Edward Dahlberg", Studi Americani, no. 11, Roma, 1965
 Mente e Misura. La Poesia di William Carlos Williams, Edizioni di Storia e Letteratura, Roma, 1970, 
 'L’Uccello del tuono e la balena'", A Note on a North Western American-Indian Tribe", Conoscenza religiosa, ed. by Elemire Zolla, La Nuova Italia, Firenze, 1970. Reprinted in Cultura indigena d'America, Scritti da "Conoscenza Religiosa" ed. by Grazia Marchianò, Edizioni di Storia e Letteratura, November 2015,  
 Margaret Mead, Il Futuro senza volto: continuità nell’evoluzione culturale, translated by Lina Unali, Laterza, Bari, 1972, ISBN A0001874429
 "Sulla Divinity School Address di Ralph Waldo Emerson e sull’uso della parola Soul", Annali delle Facoltà di Lettere-Filosofia e Magistero, vol. XXXVI, 1973, Università degli Studi di Cagliari, Sassari, 1974
 Rivoluzioni a Harvard, capitoli della storia culturale della Nuova Inghilterra, La Nuova Italia, Firenze, 1977, 
 "Ginsberg non vale a niente Steinbeck è un grande scrittore...", Paese Sera Libri, Sunday, September 11, 1977 
 "Un 'Tributo' al grande poeta","Quel viaggio in Taxi con Robert Lowell", Paese Sera Libri, Friday, September 7, 1979
 "Metaphorical and Spiritual Language in No Cross No Crown by William Penn", Annali della Facoltà di Magistero, Cagliari, 1979
 Descrizione di sé. Studio della scrittura autobiografica del ’700, Lucarini, Roma, 1979, 
 Yuri Lotman, "Sulla poesia: Testo e Sistema" (the final chapters of Analiž poetičeskogo teksta: stryktyra sticha), ed. by Simonetta Salvestroni and Lina Unali (trans. by Lina Unali pp. 133-140), in "Problemi", no. 52, May August, 1978, G.B. Palumbo, Roma
 "Percorsi su carta dell’emigrato franco-canadese Jack Kerouac" in Il Ponte, Year XXXVII, nos. 11-12, La Nuova Italia, Firenze, November 30 - December 31, 1981
 "Peculiarities in the immigration to America of Sardinians from Carloforte, 1900-1930", (Franco Mulas co-author), in Struggle and Support, Proceedings of the Italian Historical Society of America, New York, 1983
 "Italy, France and Spain in Paterson by William Carlos Williams" in Cross-Cultural Studies, American, Canadian and European Literatures: 1945-1985, ed. by Mirko Jurak, University of Ljiubliana, Ljiubliana, 1988
 "Mount Allegro and the Euro-American Common Denominators", in The Future of American Modernism: Ethnic Writing Between the Wars, ed. by W. Boelhower, VU Amsterdam Press, Amsterdam, 1990, pp. 202-216, 
 "A Progress Report on the Orality of Sardinian Migration to America" in Victorianism in the United States. Its Era and Legacy, VU University Press, Amsterdam, 1992, 
 Stella d'India: Temi imperiali e rappresentazioni dell'India, Edizioni Mediterranee, Roma, 1993, 
 "Silence of the ethnic cradle, the noise of America, The control of noise" in Technology and the American Imagination: An ongoing Challenge, RSA, Rivista di Studi Americani, 1994
 "Immigrants in Mainstream American Literature", in Ethnic Literature and Culture in the US, Canada and Australia, ed. by Igor Maver, Peter Lang, Frankfurt am Main, Berlin, New York, 1996, 
 "Conferma del mito shakespeariano in The Herbal Bed di Peter Whelan", in Mitos, Actas del VII Congreso Internacional de la Asociación Española de Semiótica, ed. by Túa Blesa, Universidad de Zaragoza, Zaragoza, 1998
 Talk-Story in Chinatown and Away, Essays on Chinese American Literature and US-China Relationships, ed. with introduction by Lina Unali, Sun Moon Lake, Roma, 1998, 
 "Americanization and Hybridization in The Hundred Secret Senses by Amy Tan" in Hitting Critical Mass, European Perspectives on Ethnicity, ed. by R. Davis, University of California, Berkeley, 1998
 "The Chinese Martial Arts in Chinese American Writers" in "Englishes", no. 7, year III, Pagine, Roma, 1999 ISSN 1593-2494
 "Un edificio di Sabbia. Da Gregory Bateson a Mary Catherine Bateson e le tendenze anti-accademiche nella tradizione letteraria americana" in Metamorfosi della Parola tra Letteratura e Filosofia, ed. by Lia Secci, Artemide Edizioni, Roma, 2001, 
 "The sense of suspense in politically troubled waters: Parents and Politics in Jerre Mangione’s To Walk the Night and Lan Cao’s Monkey Bridge" in Asia and the West. A Difficult Intercontinental Relationship, Proceedings of the II AW-dir Annual Conference December 19–21, 2001, ed. by Elisabetta Marino, Sun Moon Lake, Roma, 2003, pp. 38-49, 
 "A Case of Double Logic in Amy Tan’s The Bonesetter’s Daughter with a Comparison with Honoré de Balzac’s The Accursed Child" in The Cultural Shuttle: The United States of/in Europe, ed. by V. Béghain e M. Chénetier, VU University Press, Amsterdam, 2004, pp. 229-236, 
 Asia and the West. The Body the Gods, Proceedings of the III AW-dir Annual Conference December 19–21, 2002, ed. with introduction by Lina Unali, Sun Moon Lake, Roma, 2004, 
 "L’integrazione delle arti nel film Hero (titolo cinese: Ying Xiong) di Zhang Yi Mou", May 2006
 Lina Unali and Aiping Zhang, "Chinese Ancestors in Ancient and Modern China", Testo e Senso, no. 7, 2006, ISSN 2036-2293
 New Asian American Writers and News from UK, Italy and Asia: Literature and the Visual Arts, Vol. I, ed. with introduction by Lina Unali, SML Telematic Edition, 2006, 
 "Americanization and hybridization in The hundred secret senses by Amy Tan" in Amy Tan, ed. and with introduction by Harold Bloom, Bloom’s Literary Criticism, Chelsea House, New York, 2009, pp. 113-120, 
 Una Città tra Oriente e Occidente. Istambul Shanghai (A City between East and West. Istambul Shanghai), Vol. I, ed. with introduction by Lina Unali, SML Telematic Edition, 2010, 
 "Figure bizantine nelle novelle di Grazia Deledda", in Dalla quercia del monte al cedro del Libano. Le novelle di Grazia Deledda, ed. by Giovanni Pirodda, ISRE Edizioni - AIPSA Edizioni, Cagliari, 2010, pp. 45-52, 
 Eugenio Unali, Elementi di Equitazione. L’addestramento, ed. by Lina Unali, Lago Sole Luna, Kindle Edition, 2012
 Rapporto sulla Cina, Editori Riuniti University Press, Roma, 2013, 
 "Ad Alatri negli altri luoghi di Grazia Deledda", in L’Unione Sarda, April 4, 2014
 Beautiful China, Cambridge Scholars Publishing, Newcastle upon Tyne, 2016,  
 William Shakespeare amidst Monarchs, Revolutions and Actors, Lago Sole Luna, c. 2019

Narratives
 La Sardegna del desiderio, Ripostes, Roma, Salerno, 1991
 Il seme dell’Acero, Esperienze della Sardegna, Carìa, Cagliari, 1977
 Trilogia della Somalia musulmana, Il Grappolo, Salerno, 2001 
 Viaggio  Istambul, Edes, Biblioteca di Babele, A series directed by Nicola Tanda, Sassari, 2009, 
 Andalusian General. A narrative of Sardinia and Spain, Edes, Sassari, 2010, 
 My Digital Talk Story, Editori Riuniti, Rome, 2015,

Poetry
 "Sartiglia", Translation in Gaelic of the poem "Sartiglia" published in Agus, no. 24, Dublin, 1984
 Sarde poesie della mente, Sun Moon Lake, Rome, 2008, 
 Winter in Pearl Street (Kindle Edition), 
 Lina Unali, Tropismi di persona, in Joran, Aletti Editore, 2015, 
 La grande pioggia e il fiume, EDES, 2017,

Other notable activities
 Instructor of Tai Chi Chuan at the School of Master Li Rong Mei 
 Youtube, Inventario di quel che mi hai dato (Inventory of what you gave to me) 2013 August 25 (videopoetry)
 An old Sardinian recipe in The MELUS Family Cookbook, Society of Multi-Ethnic Literatures of the United States, 2005
 Trilingual Deposit an online Interview
 Online Logudorese Italian Glossary

Bibliography
 Prof. Lina Unali’s page on the University of Rome Torvergata Website
 Presentation of Lina Unali by the Italian Publisher Editori Riuniti University Press
 "Review: Unali, Mente e misura: La poesia di William Carlos Williams", in American Literature, Vol. 43, No. 1 (March, 1971), pp. 670-671
 Roger Asselineau, "Unali, L.: Descrizione di sé", in Études anglaises: Grande-Bretagne, États-Unis, Volume 34, ed. by Charles Cestre and Aurélien Digeon, H. Didier, 1981, p. 493. (The main interest of the article is Asselineau's analysis of Lina Unali's classification of American autobiographies, starting from William Penn's Some Fruits of Solitude).
 Richard Beck, Introduction to MM: The Sentence Commuted
 E. Marino, "Toast a Lina Unali", in Sincronie: rivista semestrale di letterature, teatro e sistemi di pensiero, Volume 9, Edizione 17 -Volume 10, Edizione 20, Vecchiarelli, 2006, pp. 261–264.
 Review to Lina Unali's Il racconto digitale by Martina Volpe in Testo e Senso, no. 15, 2014, pp. 211–213

References

External links
 Dizionario-sardo-logudorese-italiano
 Raul Mordenti, I libri di famiglia in Italia, Volume 2, Edizioni di Storia e Letteratura, Rome, 1985, 2001, p. 81n.
 Luisanna Fodde, Race, Ethnicity and Dialects: Language Policy and Ethnic Minorities in the United States, FrancoAngeli, Milan, 2002, p. 11.
 Louisa Calio, "Somalia Premonitions of Iraq: War, Women and Healing A Look at Somalia in Lina Unali's Somali queen, Somali king and Eritrea in Louisa Calio's Journey to the Heart Waters" (2003), in Italian Americans and the Arts & Culture, 2007
 "L’oralità nella scrittura di Lina Unali", interview by Elisabetta Marino, El-Ghibli 2, no. 8, June 2005
 Manlio Brigaglia, "Dalla Sardegna a Istambul, e ritorno", Il Messaggero Sardo, May 29, 2009
 Maria Pina Ciancio,"Il Racconto digitale di Lina Unali", La Recherche, 2014
 Antonella Amato, "Rapporto sulla Cina di Lina Unali", in Il Messaggero sardo, February 24, 2013
 Introduction to The West in Asia and Asia in the West: Essays on Transnational Interactions, ed. by Elisabetta Marino and Tanfer Emin Tunc, McFarland, 2015 
 Ten Poems from Second, 1, Translation by Lina Unali in Madison Morrison's Website

Living people
Italian women academics
1936 births
Sapienza University of Rome alumni
Academic staff of the University of Cagliari
Academic staff of the University of Rome Tor Vergata
Academic staff of Somali National University